Bendel Insurance Football Club, also known as Insurance of Benin Football Club or simply Bendel Insurance, is a football club based in Benin City, Nigeria. The club plays in the Nigeria Professional football league. They were originally known as the Vipers of Benin. They play their home matches at Samuel Ogbemudia Stadium, which has a capacity of 12,000.

History
Created by Dr. Samuel Osaigbovo Ogbemudia, Bendel Insurance was one of the founding members of the Nigerian Premier League in 1972.

The team had its first month of the 2007–08 season delayed because of a management dispute over who controlled the team. The crisis led to at one time two different clubs claiming the name Insurance. They were relegated at the end of the 2007–08 season after finishing in last place, the first relegation from the top level in the team's history.

In August 2008, the ownership crisis was settled and the Edo State government took control. Thus the name officially reverted to Bendel Insurance Football Club.

However, the financial problems continued throughout the season. In February 2009, Insurance was banned from using their stadium temporarily because it was not up to league standards. In March, they were one of eight teams threatened with having their participation suspended due to a backlog of debts and fines. Finally, they were exiled to Ilorin, North Central Nigeria, for their final home game of the season after crowd trouble in a 1–1 tie against Shooting Stars FC that put an end to their promotion chances. The reason for Bendel Insurance's breakdown was because of the ownership situations.

Bendel Insurance were promoted back to the top flight for the 2019 season after spending over ten years in lower divisions. They were relegated back to the NNL after one season. They won promotion back to the NPFL on the penultimate day of the 2022 season.

Achievements
Nigeria Premier League: 2
1973, 1979

Nigerian FA Cup: 3
1972, 1978, 1980

CAF Cup: 1
1994

West African Club Championship (UFOA Cup): 3
1993, 1994, 1995

Performance in CAF competitions
African Cup of Champions Clubs: 2 appearances
1974: Second Round
1980: Semi-Finals

CAF Confederation Cup: 1 appearance
2005 – Second Round

CAF Cup: 1 appearance
1994 – Champion

CAF Cup Winners' Cup: 2 appearances
1979 – Semi-Finals
1982 – Second Round

Current team

As of 30 January 2019

Notable players
 Peter Odemwingie
 Ambruse Vanzekin
 Julius Aghahowa
 Elderson Echiéjilé
 Olubayo Adefemi
 Bright Omokaro

References

 
Association football clubs established in 1972
Football clubs in Nigeria
Benin City
Sport in Edo State
1972 establishments in Nigeria
Sports clubs in Nigeria
Financial services association football clubs in Nigeria
CAF Cup winning clubs